Tapar can refer to:

People
Muhammad I Tapar, a Sultan of the Seljuq Empire from 1105–1118
Tapar, a Visayan shaman in the Philippines who led a native revolt against the Spanish Empire in 1663

Other
Tapar, a trade name for paracetamol